Washington Township is a township in Jewell County, Kansas, USA.  As of the 2000 census, its population was 50.

Geography
Washington Township covers an area of 35.75 square miles (92.6 square kilometers).

Unincorporated towns
 Montrose
(This list is based on USGS data and may include former settlements.)

Adjacent townships
 Richland Township (north)
 Sinclair Township (northeast)
 Grant Township (east)
 Vicksburg Township (southeast)
 Buffalo Township (south)
 Calvin Township (southwest)
 Center Township (west)
 Holmwood Township (northwest)

Cemeteries
The township contains three cemeteries: Delta, East Buffalo and Pleasant View.

Major highways
 U.S. Route 36
 K-14

References
 U.S. Board on Geographic Names (GNIS)
 United States Census Bureau cartographic boundary files

External links
 US-Counties.com
 City-Data.com

Townships in Jewell County, Kansas
Townships in Kansas